Flax basis is a moth of the family Erebidae first described by Michael Fibiger in 2011. It is found in Laos (Vientiane), in Southeast Asia.

Description
The wingspan is 10-10.5 mm.

The ground colour of the forewings is brown, including the fringes. The base of the costa has a long, dark-brown patch. There is a dark-brown quadrangular patch in the upper medial area. The crosslines are indistinct and dark brown. The terminal line is indicated by dark-brown interveinal dots.

The hindwings are grey. The underside of the forewings is unicolorous brown and the underside of the hindwings is grey with a discal spot.

References

Micronoctuini
Moths described in 2011
Moths of Asia